George Washington Henry  (August 10, 1863 – December 30, 1934), was a former professional baseball player who played outfield in the National League for the 1893 Cincinnati Reds. He played in the minor leagues through 1905.

External links

1863 births
1934 deaths
Major League Baseball outfielders
Baseball players from Pennsylvania
Cincinnati Reds players
19th-century baseball players
Lynn Lions players
Worcester Grays players
Springfield Senators players
Quincy Black Birds players
Baltimore Orioles (Atlantic Association) players
Milwaukee Brewers (minor league) players
Green Bay Bays players
Wilkes-Barre Coal Barons players
Toledo White Stockings players
Indianapolis Hoosiers (minor league) players
Bangor Millionaires players
Rochester Browns players
Indianapolis Indians players
Brockton Shoemakers players
Johnstown Mormans players
Palmyra Mormans players
Allentown Peanuts players
Norwich Witches players
New London Whalers players
Newark Sailors players
Springfield Ponies players
Waterbury Rough Riders players
Hartford Senators players